The year 1996 is the second year in the history of Fighting Network Rings, a mixed martial arts promotion based in Japan. In 1996 Fighting Network Rings held four events beginning with, Rings: Budokan Hall 1996.

Events list

Rings: Budokan Hall 1996

Rings: Budokan Hall 1996 was an event held on January 24, 1996, at Budokan Hall in Tokyo, Japan.

Results

Rings Holland: Kings of Martial Arts

Rings Holland: Kings of Martial Arts was an event held on February 18, 1996, at Sport Hall Zuid in Amsterdam, North Holland, Netherlands.

Results

Rings: Maelstrom 6

Rings: Maelstrom 6 was an event held on August 24, 1996, in Japan.

Results

Rings: Battle Dimensions Tournament 1996 Opening Round

Rings: Battle Dimensions Tournament 1996 Opening Round was an event held on October 25, 1996.

Results

See also 
 Fighting Network Rings
 List of Fighting Network Rings events

References

Fighting Network Rings events
1996 in mixed martial arts